Francesco Amantini (born 9 September 1987) is an Italian footballer. He plays as a midfielder for Novafeltria Calcio

References

External links 
 Francesco Amantini's profile on San Marino Calcio's official website 
 AIC profile (data by football.it) 

Italian footballers
A.S.D. Victor San Marino players
Serie C players
1987 births
Living people
Association football midfielders
Universiade silver medalists for Italy
Universiade medalists in football
Medalists at the 2009 Summer Universiade